Khandaker Nurul Alam (1936–2016) was a Bangladeshi music director. He has composed music for 32 films. The following is a list of films he scored:

filmography

Year unknown

Background score only

References

Sources
 

Discographies of Bangladeshi artists